The 1964 Western Kentucky Hilltoppers football team represented Western Kentucky State College (now known as Western Kentucky University) as a member of the Ohio Valley Conference (OVC) during the 1964 NCAA College Division football season. Led by seventh-year head coach Nick Denes, the Hilltoppers compiled an overall record of 6–3–1 with a mark of 3–3–1 in conference play, tying for third place in the OVC. The team's captains were Stan Napper and  Ken Waller.

Schedule

References

Western Kentucky
Western Kentucky Hilltoppers football seasons
Western Kentucky Hilltoppers football